There are a number of listed buildings in Cumbria. The term "listed building", in the United Kingdom, refers to a building or structure designated as being of special architectural, historical, or cultural significance. Details of all the listed buildings are contained in the National Heritage List for England. They are categorised in three grades: Grade I consists of buildings of outstanding architectural or historical interest, Grade II* includes significant buildings of more than local interest and Grade II consists of buildings of special architectural or historical interest. Buildings in England are listed by the Secretary of State for Culture, Media and Sport on recommendations provided by English Heritage, which also determines the grading.

Some listed buildings are looked after by the National Trust or English Heritage while others are in private ownership or administered by trusts.

Listed buildings by grade
Grade I listed buildings in Cumbria
Grade II* listed buildings in Allerdale
Grade II* listed buildings in Barrow-in-Furness (borough)
Grade II* listed buildings in the City of Carlisle
Grade II* listed buildings in Copeland
Grade II* listed buildings in Eden District
Grade II* listed buildings in South Lakeland

Listed buildings by district or unitary authority
Within each local government district, buildings are listed by civil parish or unparished area.

Allerdale

Listed buildings in Above Derwent
Listed buildings in Aikton
Listed buildings in Allhallows, Cumbria
Listed buildings in Allonby
Listed buildings in Aspatria
Listed buildings in Bassenthwaite
Listed buildings in Bewaldeth and Snittlegarth
Listed buildings in Blennerhasset and Torpenhow
Listed buildings in Blindbothel
Listed buildings in Blindcrake
Listed buildings in Boltons
Listed buildings in Borrowdale
Listed buildings in Bothel and Threapland
Listed buildings in Bowness
Listed buildings in Bridekirk
Listed buildings in Brigham, Cumbria
Listed buildings in Bromfield, Cumbria
Listed buildings in Broughton, Cumbria
Listed buildings in Broughton Moor
Listed buildings in Buttermere, Cumbria
Listed buildings in Caldbeck
Listed buildings in Camerton, Cumbria
Listed buildings in Cockermouth
Listed buildings in Crosscanonby
Listed buildings in Dean, Cumbria
Listed buildings in Dundraw
Listed buildings in Embleton, Cumbria
Listed buildings in Gilcrux
Listed buildings in Greysouthen
Listed buildings in Hayton, Allerdale
Listed buildings in Holme Abbey
Listed buildings in Holme East Waver
Listed buildings in Holme Low
Listed buildings in Holme St Cuthbert
Listed buildings in Ireby and Uldale
Listed buildings in Keswick, Cumbria
Listed buildings in Kirkbampton
Listed buildings in Kirkbride, Cumbria
Listed buildings in Lorton, Cumbria
Listed buildings in Loweswater, Cumbria
Listed buildings in Maryport
Listed buildings in Oughterside and Allerby
Listed buildings in Papcastle
Listed buildings in Plumbland
Listed buildings in Seaton, Cumbria
Listed buildings in Sebergham
Listed buildings in Setmurthy
Listed buildings in Silloth-on-Solway
Listed buildings in Thursby
Listed buildings in Underskiddaw
Listed buildings in Waverton, Cumbria
Listed buildings in Westnewton, Cumbria
Listed buildings in Westward, Cumbria
Listed buildings in Wigton
Listed buildings in Winscales
Listed buildings in Woodside, Cumbria
Listed buildings in Workington
Listed buildings in Wythop

Barrow-in-Furness

Listed buildings in Askam and Ireleth
Listed buildings in Barrow-in-Furness
Listed buildings in Dalton Town with Newton
Listed buildings in Lindal and Marton

City of Carlisle

Listed buildings in Arthuret
Listed buildings in Askerton
Listed buildings in Beaumont, Cumbria
Listed buildings in Bewcastle
Listed buildings in Brampton, Carlisle
Listed buildings in Burgh by Sands
Listed buildings in Burtholme
Listed buildings in Carlisle
Listed buildings in Castle Carrock
Listed buildings in Cummersdale
Listed buildings in Cumrew
Listed buildings in Cumwhitton
Listed buildings in Dalston, Cumbria
Listed buildings in Farlam
Listed buildings in Hayton, Carlisle
Listed buildings in Hethersgill
Listed buildings in Irthington
Listed buildings in Kingmoor
Listed buildings in Kingwater
Listed buildings in Kirkandrews
Listed buildings in Kirklinton Middle
Listed buildings in Nether Denton
Listed buildings in Orton, Carlisle
Listed buildings in Rockcliffe, Cumbria
Listed buildings in Scaleby
Listed buildings in Solport
Listed buildings in St Cuthbert Without
Listed buildings in Stanwix Rural
Listed buildings in Stapleton, Cumbria
Listed buildings in Upper Denton
Listed buildings in Waterhead, Carlisle
Listed buildings in Westlinton
Listed buildings in Wetheral

Copeland

Listed buildings in Arlecdon and Frizington
Listed buildings in Bootle, Cumbria
Listed buildings in Cleator Moor
Listed buildings in Distington
Listed buildings in Drigg and Carleton
Listed buildings in Egremont, Cumbria
Listed buildings in Ennerdale and Kinniside
Listed buildings in Eskdale, Cumbria
Listed buildings in Gosforth, Cumbria
Listed buildings in Haile, Cumbria
Listed buildings in Irton with Santon
Listed buildings in Lamplugh
Listed buildings in Millom
Listed buildings in Millom Without
Listed buildings in Moresby, Cumbria
Listed buildings in Muncaster
Listed buildings in Parton, Cumbria
Listed buildings in Ponsonby, Cumbria
Listed buildings in Seascale
Listed buildings in St Bees
Listed buildings in St. Bridget Beckermet
Listed buildings in St. John Beckermet
Listed buildings in Waberthwaite
Listed buildings in Wasdale
Listed buildings in Weddicar
Listed buildings in Whicham
Listed buildings in Whitehaven

Eden

Listed buildings in Ainstable
Listed buildings in Alston Moor
Listed buildings in Appleby-in-Westmorland
Listed buildings in Asby, Eden
Listed buildings in Askham, Cumbria
Listed buildings in Bampton, Cumbria
Listed buildings in Barton, Cumbria
Listed buildings in Bolton, Cumbria
Listed buildings in Brough, Cumbria
Listed buildings in Brougham, Cumbria
Listed buildings in Castle Sowerby
Listed buildings in Catterlen
Listed buildings in Cliburn, Cumbria
Listed buildings in Clifton, Cumbria
Listed buildings in Colby, Cumbria
Listed buildings in Crackenthorpe
Listed buildings in Crosby Garrett
Listed buildings in Crosby Ravensworth
Listed buildings in Culgaith
Listed buildings in Dacre, Cumbria
Listed buildings in Dufton
Listed buildings in Glassonby
Listed buildings in Great Salkeld
Listed buildings in Great Strickland
Listed buildings in Greystoke, Cumbria
Listed buildings in Hartley, Cumbria
Listed buildings in Helbeck
Listed buildings in Hesket, Cumbria
Listed buildings in Hoff, Cumbria
Listed buildings in Hunsonby
Listed buildings in Hutton, Cumbria
Listed buildings in Kaber, Cumbria
Listed buildings in King's Meaburn
Listed buildings in Kirkby Stephen
Listed buildings in Kirkby Thore
Listed buildings in Kirkoswald, Cumbria
Listed buildings in Langwathby
Listed buildings in Lazonby
Listed buildings in Little Strickland
Listed buildings in Long Marton
Listed buildings in Lowther, Cumbria
Listed buildings in Mallerstang
Listed buildings in Martindale, Cumbria
Listed buildings in Matterdale
Listed buildings in Milburn, Cumbria
Listed buildings in Morland, Cumbria
Listed buildings in Mungrisdale
Listed buildings in Murton, Cumbria
Listed buildings in Musgrave, Cumbria
Listed buildings in Nateby, Cumbria
Listed buildings in Newbiggin, Kirkby Thore
Listed buildings in Newby, Cumbria
Listed buildings in Ormside
Listed buildings in Orton, Eden
Listed buildings in Ousby
Listed buildings in Patterdale
Listed buildings in Penrith, Cumbria
Listed buildings in Ravenstonedale
Listed buildings in Shap
Listed buildings in Shap Rural
Listed buildings in Skelton, Cumbria
Listed buildings in Sleagill
Listed buildings in Sockbridge and Tirril
Listed buildings in Soulby
Listed buildings in Stainmore
Listed buildings in Tebay
Listed buildings in Temple Sowerby
Listed buildings in Threlkeld
Listed buildings in Thrimby
Listed buildings in Waitby
Listed buildings in Warcop
Listed buildings in Wharton, Cumbria
Listed buildings in Winton, Cumbria
Listed buildings in Yanwath and Eamont Bridge

South Lakeland

Listed buildings in Aldingham
Listed buildings in Arnside
Listed buildings in Barbon
Listed buildings in Beetham
Listed buildings in Blawith and Subberthwaite
Listed buildings in Broughton East
Listed buildings in Broughton West
Listed buildings in Burton-in-Kendal
Listed buildings in Cartmel Fell
Listed buildings in Casterton, Cumbria
Listed buildings in Claife
Listed buildings in Colton, Cumbria
Listed buildings in Coniston, Cumbria
Listed buildings in Crook, Cumbria
Listed buildings in Crosthwaite and Lyth
Listed buildings in Dent, Cumbria
Listed buildings in Dunnerdale-with-Seathwaite
Listed buildings in Egton with Newland
Listed buildings in Fawcett Forest
Listed buildings in Firbank
Listed buildings in Garsdale
Listed buildings in Grange-over-Sands
Listed buildings in Grayrigg
Listed buildings in Haverthwaite
Listed buildings in Hawkshead
Listed buildings in Helsington
Listed buildings in Heversham
Listed buildings in Hincaster
Listed buildings in Holme, Cumbria
Listed buildings in Hugill
Listed buildings in Hutton Roof, South Lakeland
Listed buildings in Kendal
Listed buildings in Kentmere
Listed buildings in Killington, Cumbria
Listed buildings in Kirkby Ireleth
Listed buildings in Lakes, Cumbria
Listed buildings in Lambrigg
Listed buildings in Levens, Cumbria
Listed buildings in Lindale and Newton-in-Cartmel
Listed buildings in Longsleddale
Listed buildings in Lower Allithwaite
Listed buildings in Lower Holker
Listed buildings in Lowick, Cumbria
Listed buildings in Lupton, Cumbria
Listed buildings in Mansergh, Cumbria
Listed buildings in Meathop and Ulpha
Listed buildings in Middleton, Cumbria
Listed buildings in Milnthorpe
Listed buildings in Natland
Listed buildings in Nether Staveley
Listed buildings in New Hutton
Listed buildings in Old Hutton and Holmescales
Listed buildings in Over Staveley
Listed buildings in Pennington, Cumbria
Listed buildings in Preston Patrick
Listed buildings in Preston Richard
Listed buildings in Satterthwaite
Listed buildings in Scalthwaiterigg
Listed buildings in Sedbergh
Listed buildings in Sedgwick, Cumbria
Listed buildings in Selside and Fawcett Forest
Listed buildings in Skelsmergh
Listed buildings in Skelwith
Listed buildings in Stainton, South Lakeland
Listed buildings in Staveley-in-Cartmel
Listed buildings in Strickland Ketel
Listed buildings in Strickland Roger
Listed buildings in Torver
Listed buildings in Ulverston
Listed buildings in Underbarrow and Bradleyfield
Listed buildings in Urswick
Listed buildings in Whinfell
Listed buildings in Whitwell and Selside
Listed buildings in Windermere, Cumbria (town)
Listed buildings in Witherslack

Churches
Grade I listed churches in Cumbria

References